The 2004 North Carolina lieutenant governor election was held on November 2, 2004, as part of the elections to the Council of State.  North Carolina also held a gubernatorial election on the same day, but the offices of Governor and Lieutenant Governor are elected independently.

Result

Candidates

Democrats
 Curtis R. Hert, Jr.
 Bev Perdue – incumbent lieutenant governor

Republicans
 Timothy Cook – chemist
 Jim Snyder – attorney, former State Representative, Former Davidson County Republican Party chair, and candidate for US Senate in 2002
 Thomas Stith, III – Durham City Councilman

Libertarians
 Chris Cole

Footnotes

Lieutenant Governor
North Carolina
2004